The R80 is a provincial route in the City of Tshwane Metropolitan Municipality in Gauteng, South Africa that connects the Pretoria CBD with Mabopane and Soshanguve. It is a dual carriageway freeway, with 2 or 3 lanes in each direction at different points and is named the Mabopane Highway.

Route
It starts at a t-junction with the M1 road of Tshwane in the suburb of Roseville (5km north of Pretoria CBD), heading westwards and meeting the R55 road. It passes through the Theo Martins Gateway (Afrikaans:Theo Martins Poort), a mountain pass over the Magaliesberg mountains, and the northbound carriageway has a rising hairpin bend, approaching the pass, as the freeway abruptly switches an from east-west to a south–north direction.

Proceeding northwards, the R80 meets the R513 road before forming an interchange with the N4 National Route (Northern Pretoria Bypass; Platinum Highway) in Akasia.

The highway proceeds northwards to meet the R566 road at an off-ramp just east of Rosslyn and proceeds to end at a junction with the M39 road of Tshwane in Soshanguve, with the M39 providing access to Mabopane (which is just west of Soshanguve).

References

External links
 Routes Travel Info

80
Provincial routes in South Africa